A resort (North American English) is a self-contained commercial establishment that tries to provide most of a vacationer's wants, such as food, drink, swimming, lodging, sports, entertainment, and shopping, on the premises. The term resort may be used for a hotel property that provides an array of amenities, typically including entertainment and recreational activities. A hotel is frequently a central feature of a resort, such as the Grand Hotel at Mackinac Island, Michigan. Some resorts are also condominium complexes that are timeshares or owned fractionally or wholly owned condominium. A resort is not always a commercial establishment operated by a single company, but in the late 20th century, that sort of facility became more common.

In British English, "resort" means a town which people visit for holidays and days out which usually contains hotels at which such holidaymakers stay.  Examples would include Blackpool and Brighton.

Destination resort 

A destination resort is a resort that itself contains the necessary guest attraction capabilities so it does not need to be near a destination (town, historic site, theme park, or other) to attract its patrons. A commercial establishment at a resort destination such as a recreational area, a scenic or historic site, amusement park, a gaming facility, or other tourist attraction may compete with other businesses at a destination. Consequently, another quality of a destination resort is that it offers food, drink, lodging, sports, entertainment, and shopping within the facility so that guests have no need to leave the facility throughout their stay.  Commonly, the facilities are of higher quality than would be expected if one were to stay at a hotel or eat in a town's restaurants. Some examples are Atlantis in the Bahamas; the Walt Disney World Resort, near Orlando, Florida, United States; PortAventura World, near Barcelona on the Costa Daurada in Spain; Costa do Sauípe, Northeastern Brazil; Laguna Phuket, Thailand and Sun City, near Johannesburg, South Africa. Closely related to resorts are convention and large meeting sites. Generally, they occur in cities, where special meeting halls, together with ample accommodations and varied dining and entertainment, are provided.

All-inclusive resort 

An all-inclusive resort charges a fixed price that includes most or all items.  At a minimum, most inclusive resorts include lodging, unlimited food, drink, sports activities, and entertainment for the fixed price. In recent years, the number of resorts in the United States offering "all-inclusive" amenities has decreased dramatically. In 1961, over half offered such plans, but in 2007, less than a tenth do so.

All-inclusive resorts are found in the Caribbean, particularly in Jamaica, Dominican Republic; in Egypt, and elsewhere. Notable examples are Club Med, Sandals Resorts, and Beaches Resorts.

An all-inclusive resort includes three meals daily, soft drinks, most alcoholic drinks, gratuities, and usually other services in the price. Many also offer sports and other activities included in the price as well. They are often located in warmer regions. The all-inclusive model originated in the Club Med resorts, which were founded by the Belgian Gérard Blitz.

Some all-inclusive resorts are designed for specific groups. For example, some resorts cater for adults only, and even more-specialized properties accept couples only. Other all-inclusive resorts are geared toward families, with facilities like craft centers, game rooms, and water parks to keep children of all ages entertained. All-inclusive resorts are also very popular locations for destination weddings.

Recreation 
A spa resort is a short-term residential/lodging facility with the primary purpose of providing individual services for spa goers to develop healthy habits. Historically, many such spas were developed at the location of natural hot springs or sources of mineral waters. Typically over a seven-day stay, such facilities provide a comprehensive program that includes spa services, physical fitness activities, healthy diet programs, and special interest programming.

Golf resorts are resorts that cater specifically to the sport of golf, and they include access to one or more golf courses and/or clubhouses. Golf resorts typically provide golf packages that provide visitors with all greens and cart fees, range balls, accommodations, and meals.

In North America, a ski resort is generally a destination resort in a ski area. The term is less likely to refer to a town or village.

A megaresort is a type of destination resort of an exceptionally-large size, such as those along the Las Vegas Strip. In Singapore, integrated resort is a euphemism for a casino-based destination resort.

A holiday village is a type of self-contained resort in Europe whose accommodation is generally in villas.  A holiday camp, in the United Kingdom, refers to a resort whose accommodation is in chalets or static caravans.

Timeshare 
There are more than 1500 timeshare resorts in the United States that are operated by major hospitality, timeshare-specific, or independent companies. They represent 198,000 residences and nearly 9 million owners, who pay an average $880 per year in maintenance fees. A reported 16% of the residences became vacation rentals.

Notable historic resorts 
 Baiae, Italy, a famous historic resort of the ancient world that was popular over 2000 years ago. 
 Capri, an island near Naples, Italy, has attracted visitors since Roman times.
 Monte Ne, near Rogers, Arkansas, a famous historic resort which was active in the early 20th century. At its peak, more than 10,000 people a year visited its hotels. Two of its hotels, Missouri Row and Oklahoma Row, were the largest log buildings in the world. Monte Ne closed in the 1930s and was ultimately submerged under Beaver Lake in the 1960s.
 Tawawa House, also known as Tawawa Springs or Xenia Springs, inspired Dolen Perkins-Valdez to write her debut novel, Wench (2010), when she read about it in an autobiography of W.E.B. Dubois. The book mentioned in passing that the land for Wilberforce University had once been used for a privately owned resort called Tawawa House, where white slave owners would bring the black slaves that they kept as mistresses.

Resort towns 
Towns that are resorts or in which tourism or vacationing is a major part of the local activity are sometimes called resort towns. If by the sea, they are called seaside resorts.  Inland resorts include ski resorts, mountain resorts and spa towns. Well-known resort towns include Punta Cana in Dominican Republic, Bandipur in Nepal, Bali in Indonesia, Sochi in Russia, Mount Lebanon Tourism in Lebanon, Barizo in Spain, Cortina d'Ampezzo in Italy, Druskininkai in Lithuania, Cartagena de Indias in Colombia, Cancún in Mexico, Newport, Rhode Island, and Key West, Florida, in the United States, Ischgl in Austria, St. Moritz in Switzerland and Blackpool in the United Kingdom.

A resort island is an island or an archipelago that contains resorts, hotels, restaurants, tourist attractions, and its amenities. Maldives is considered to have the best island resorts, which have become famous among the top celebrities and sportspersons around the world.

Seaside resorts are located on a coast. In the United Kingdom, many seaside towns have turned to other entertainment industries, and some of them have much nightlife. The cinemas and theatres often remain to become host to a number of pubs, bars, restaurants, and nightclubs. Most of their entertainment facilities cater to local people, and the beaches still remain popular during the summer months.

In Europe and North America, ski resorts are towns and villages in ski areas, with support services for skiing such as hotels and chalets, equipment rental, ski schools and ski lifts to access the slopes.

Resorts for different purposes also exist. An example is Yulara, Northern Territory, which exists to serve Uluru (Ayers Rock) and Kata Tjuta (The Olgas) in Australia.

See also 
Boutique hotel
Condo hotel
Destination club
Resort architecture
Sanatorium (resort)
Seaside resort
Spa
Vacation rental

References